The Supreme Military Council was the body that ruled Nigeria after the 1983 Nigerian coup d'état. Its chairman, Muhammadu Buhari, was the head of state. It lasted until the 1985 Nigerian coup d'état, when Ibrahim Babangida replaced the body with a new Armed Forces Ruling Council (which lasted until 1993).

A previous Supreme Military Council was established by Yakubu Gowon and ruled Nigeria from 1966–1979 until the Second Nigerian Republic.

Members

Sources
"Nigeria 1984: An Interim Report", CSIS Africa Notes, Georgetown University Centre for Strategic and International Studies, 24 (February 29, 1984)
The Europa World Year Book 1985, Volume II, p. 2322

Politics of Nigeria
1980s in Nigeria
1983 establishments in Nigeria
1985 disestablishments in Africa
Military dictatorships